Brigadier Mayor César Raúl Ojeda Airport  is an airport in San Luis Province, Argentina serving the city of San Luis. It is operated by Aeropuertos Argentina 2000.

From March to May 2007, the airport was closed for repaving of its runway.

Airlines and destinations

Statistics

See also

Transport in Argentina
List of airports in Argentina

References

External links 
Organismo Regulador del Sistema Nacional de Aeropuertos
OurAirports - Brigadier Mayor D Cesar Raul Ojeda Airport

Airports in San Luis Province